Allison Hayes (born Mary Jane Hayes; March 6, 1930 – February 27, 1977) was an American film and television actress and model.

Early life
Allison Hayes was born to William E. Hayes and Charlotte Gibson Hayes in Charleston, West Virginia. She was in the class of 1948 at Calvin Coolidge High School. Hayes won the title of Miss District of Columbia. She represented D.C. in the 1949 Miss America pageant. Although she did not win the competition, it provided her with the opportunity to work in local television before moving to Hollywood to work for Universal Pictures in 1954.

Career

Hayes made her film debut in the 1954 comedy Francis Joins the WACS. Her second film, Sign of the Pagan, provided her with an important role in a relatively minor film. Opposite Jack Palance, she played the part of a siren who ultimately kills him. Despite the strength of her second film role, she played minor roles in her next few films. Originally cast in Foxfire (1955), she was removed from the film during a lawsuit filed against Universal Pictures for injuries, including broken ribs, that she had sustained during the filming of Sign of the Pagan. Released from her contract, she was signed by Columbia Pictures in 1955.

In Chicago Syndicate, her first film for Columbia, Hayes played Joyce Kern – alias Sue Morton – who seeks vengeance for the death of her father at the hand of local gangster Arnie Valent. Count Three and Pray gave her the role that she later described as the best of her career. Hayes played with Van Heflin, co-starring with Raymond Burr and Joanne Woodward in her debut. As an arrogant Southern belle, she was in love with Heflin, returning from the Civil War as a minister. After being spurned by him, Hayes is reduced to becoming Burr's live-in "housekeeper". Hayes had several well-played dramatic scenes. However, when the film was released much of the attention of reviewers was focused on Woodward, and Hayes was largely ignored. She appeared in films such as The Steel Jungle, Mohawk, and Gunslinger (all 1956), but a fall from a horse during the filming of the latter left Hayes with a broken arm and unable to work. After she recovered, she began appearing in supporting roles in television productions. 

In 1958, she played in several B movies, including Wolf Dog as well as taking the lead role in Attack of the 50 Foot Woman, where she plays the part of an abused socialite who grows to giant size because of an alien encounter. In this film, she starred with Yvette Vickers and William Hudson, and it is probably her best-known role. With its science fiction storyline and low budget, the film attained popularity with some movie fans, and in the subsequent years has attracted a cult film following based primarily on Hayes spending almost all the time she is enlarged calling for "Harry!" as she angrily searches for her philandering husband. The film did not lead to better roles, though she remained constantly employed and found work as a model. During 1963 and 1964, she played a continuing role in General Hospital but by this time her movie career was virtually over.

In 1958, she appeared in the recurring role of Ellie Winters, beautiful poker dealer/secret agent, in seven episodes in the western series Bat Masterson starring Gene Barry. In 1959, she was cast in Season 2 Episode 7 of Rawhide as Rose Morton. A close friend of Raymond Burr since filming Count Three and Pray, she made five guest appearances on Perry Mason during this time, including the role of Pearl Chute in the 1962 episode "The Case of the Bogus Books".

As her acting career declined, she began to experience severe health problems and was unable to walk without a cane. In severe pain, her usually good-natured personality began to change and she became emotional and volatile, making it difficult for her to secure acting work. She was given a minor role in the 1965 Elvis Presley film Tickle Me, making her final appearances in a guest role on Gomer Pyle, U.S.M.C. in 1967.

Later years and death
Hayes later said that the pain of her illness caused her to contemplate suicide, and that her symptoms were not taken seriously by doctors. Reading a medical book about the metal poisoning of factory workers, Hayes recognized the symptoms described as being similar to her own. Hayes began to question the ingredients of a calcium supplement she had been taking for a long time and when she employed a toxicologist to test a sample of the product, he determined that it had an extremely high content of lead and concluded that Hayes was most likely suffering from lead poisoning. Hayes mounted a campaign to have the FDA ban the import or sale of the food supplement.

An invalid, Hayes moved to San Clemente, California and her health continued to deteriorate. In 1976, she was diagnosed with leukemia and was treated regularly in La Jolla, California. While at the hospital receiving a blood transfusion, her condition unexpectedly and rapidly deteriorated as she experienced chills, flu-like symptoms and intense pain. She was transferred to the University of California Medical Center in San Diego, California on February 26, 1977, where she died the following day, one week before her 47th birthday. Hayes was interred with her father at Holy Cross Cemetery in Culver City, California. Her mother Charlotte died eight months later and was buried in a nearby unmarked grave. In a letter that arrived after her death, the FDA advised her that amendments were being made to the laws governing the importation of nutritional supplements, largely as a result of her situation.

Filmography

Film

Television

References

External links
 

 
 
 Allison Hayes in Trailer for Attack of the 50 Foot Woman
 Allison Hayes Biography
 Brian's Drive-In Theatre – biographical fansite
 Cult Sirens – Allison Hayes
 

1930 births
1977 deaths
American film actresses
Western (genre) film actresses
American television actresses
Female models from West Virginia
Miss America 1940s delegates
Actresses from West Virginia
20th-century American actresses
Actors from Charleston, West Virginia
Deaths from leukemia
Deaths from cancer in California
Burials at Holy Cross Cemetery, Culver City